Ned McIlroy (born July 26, 1939) is an American water polo player. He competed in the men's tournament at the 1964 Summer Olympics.

References

1939 births
Living people
American male water polo players
Olympic water polo players of the United States
Water polo players at the 1964 Summer Olympics
People from Divide County, North Dakota